The 2013 Super Fours was the tenth cricket Super Fours season. It took place in June and saw 4 teams compete in 50 over and Twenty20 matches. The four teams that competed in previous years were condensed into three, and Leicestershire and Rutland Under-16 Boys replaced Diamonds. There was no overall winner in the 50 over tournament, whilst Sapphires won the Twenty20 tournament, their fourth title in the format.

Competition format
In the one day tournament, each team played two games, with no overall winner declared.

The Twenty20 competition consisted of two semi-finals, with the winners progressing to a Final and the losers playing in a third-place play-off.

Teams

50 over

Results

Twenty20

Semi-finals

Third-place play-off

Final

References

Super Fours
2013 in English women's cricket